Dinamo-2 Moscow (Динамо-2 in Russian) are a futsal club based in Moscow, Russia. They had been founded in 2005. They compete in Russian Futsal Super League.

External links
 Official Website

Futsal clubs in Russia
MFK Dinamo Moskva
Futsal clubs established in 2005
2005 establishments in Russia